Haemachola is a genus of moths of the family Noctuidae.
Subspecies include s.lilia, s.natalie, s.vivian, s.alexis and s.jillian.

References
Natural History Museum Lepidoptera genus database

Cuculliinae